WTUS-LP (103.3 FM) is a radio station licensed to serve Tuscaloosa, Alabama.  The station is owned by the Tuscaloosa City Board of Education. It airs a Travelers' information station format interspersed with smooth jazz.

The station was assigned the WTUS-LP call letters by the Federal Communications Commission on October 19, 2004.  WTUS originally shared time on the channel with WUAC-LP.  WTUS broadcast from 6:00 AM to 6:00 PM daily, with WUAC broadcasting the other twelve hours of each day.  WUAC-LP's license was cancelled by the FCC on December 16, 2014, due to the station having been silent for more than twelve months, which allowed WTUS-LP to commence 24 hour operations.

References

External links
WTUS-LP official website

WTUS-LP service area per the FCC database

TUS-LP
TUS-LP
Talk radio stations in the United States
Tuscaloosa County, Alabama
Radio stations established in 2006
2006 establishments in Alabama